Goat Lake is an alpine lake in Custer County, Idaho, United States, located high in the Sawtooth Mountains in the Sawtooth National Recreation Area. The lake is most easily accessed from the Iron Creek trailhead, which can be accessed from State Highway 21 via Sawtooth National Forest road 619.

The route to lake follows a combination of the Iron Creek trail, Alpine Way trail, and an unmaintained hiking trail to Goat Lake.  The trail is about 8.5 miles round trip and gains 1615 feet in elevation.  Along the hiking trail are Goat Falls, which are on Goat Creek, which flows into the lake and drains out of it.

Goat Lake is in the Sawtooth Wilderness, and a wilderness permit can be obtained at trailheads. The hike to Goat Lake from the Iron Creek trailhead is a popular hike in the Sawtooth National Recreation Area. This trail gains  and offers great views of the Sawtooth Valley. Visitors are permitted to camp anywhere in the National Forest, including around Goat Lake.

See also

 List of lakes of the Sawtooth Mountains (Idaho)
 Sawtooth National Forest
 Sawtooth National Recreation Area
 Sawtooth Range (Idaho)

References

External links
 Goat Lake Trip Report

Lakes of Idaho
Lakes of Custer County, Idaho
Glacial lakes of the United States
Glacial lakes of the Sawtooth Wilderness
Articles containing video clips